Francis Kuipers (born 1941 in Woking, United Kingdom), also known as Superguitar, is a British-Dutch composer, guitarist and ethno-musicologist domiciled in Italy. In the 1960s he began creating a unique archive of music and sounds, as well as making field recordings in  Australasia, Africa, the Seychelles, India and Nepal, the Philippines and North America. He has completed numerous solo tours and played in duos with Antonello Salis, Massimo Urbani, Luis Agudo, Enrico Micheletti, Joe Garceau, Janet Smith, and Champion Jack Dupree, amongst others. In the 1980s he was guitarist for Beat Generation poet Gregory Corso. In Italy he is best known for his guest appearance on the tour of Francesco de Gregori in 1989, and for his many performances at the  Folkstudio of Rome. From 1995 to 1998 he directed the department of Music and Sound at Fabrica, the multi-media research center founded by Luciano Benetton and Oliviero Toscani at Treviso. He has collaborated with Godfrey Reggio on the films Anima Mundi, Evidence, Naqoykatsi with the music of Philip Glass and has composed the original music scores for Mary, Napoli Napoli Napoli, Go Go Tales with the voice of Grace Jones, and 4:44 The Last Day on Earth directed by Abel Ferrara.

Film scores 
 Anima Mundi 1992, directed by Godfrey Reggio
 Evidence 1995, directed by Godfrey Reggio
 Naqoyqatsi 2000, directed by Godfrey Reggio
 Mary 2005, directed by Abel Ferrara
 Go Go Tales 2007, directed by Abel Ferrara
 Napoli Napoli Napoli 2009, directed by Abel Ferrara
 The Last Day On Earth 2012, directed by Abel Ferrara

Radio 
 Blues oggi, Blues ieri, Rai Radio 3
 Folk Concerto, Rai Radio 3
 Controcanto, Rai Radio 3
 Un certo discorso, Rai Radio 3
 Pomeriggio Musicale, Rai Radio 3
 Estate Musicale, Rai Radio 3
 C'era una volta, radio drama series for Rai Educational

Theatre 
 Armageddon here I come: composer of original score. Written and directed by Michael Noonan and Alexander Guyan, Auckland, New Zealand
 Tiny Alice, composer of original score. Written by Edward Albee and directed by Abel Ferrara

Discography 

 Blindfold Blues, Allrecall (2013)
 Napoli Napoli Napoli, Original Motion Picture Soundtrack, Francis Kuipers (2010)
 Go Go Tales, Original Motion Picture Soundtrack, Cam Original Soundtrack, (2007)
 Mary, Original Motion Picture Soundtrack, Edizioni Gipsy (2005)
 Anthology, Francis Kuipers
 Country Concert. Folkstudio Record, (2000)
 Superguitar, Pineapple Records, (2001)
 Isola Anonima, L'orafo Italiano (1999)
 Gregory Corso with the music of Francis Kuipers, Red Record (1988)
 Folk, Blues & Rags, Fonit Cetra, (1975)
 Country Blues and White Spirituals, (1976) Fonit Cetra

References

External links
 
  Official WebSite

1941 births
Living people
British composers
British male guitarists
British musicologists